Renold Vatubua Quinlan (born 7 July 1989) is an Australian professional boxer of Indigenous and Fijian descent. Best known for knocking out former world champion Daniel Geale, Quinlan held the IBO super-middleweight title from 2016 to 2017.

Background
Quinlan, who grew up in Minto and Rosemeadow and attended Sarah Redfern High School. His amateur career stands at 12–3. His maternal grandfather, Sailosi Vatubua, represented Fiji in amateur boxing and won the gold medal at the 1966 South Pacific Games in Nouméa.

Career
Since turning pro in 2008, Quinlan had a lay off for nearly 2 years before returning in early 2010, then had a fight a year later, early 2011. Then he had another 2 years off. A few of his fights have been on undercards against his good friend Anthony Mundine. He also trains out of Grant's Fitness Revolution. His trainer is Lepani Wilson.

Quinlan vs. Geale

On 14 October 2016 Quinlan travelled to fight Daniel Geale on his home soil of Tasmania and he had his biggest win to date, with a victory over former IBF & WBA Middleweight Champion with a sensational 2nd round knockout.

Quinlan vs. Eubank Jr.

On 4 February 2017 Renold Quinlan was stopped in the 10th round by Chris Eubank Jr via TKO, losing his IBO super middleweight title in the process.

Quinlan vs. Damien Hooper

On 7 April 2018 Quinlan stepped up to light heavyweight division for the bout with long time rival Damien Hooper for the WBO International light heavyweight title. Hooper was ranked #9 by the WBO at light heavyweight. Quinlan and Hooper are considered two of the most talented boxers in Australia. In a very entertaining and fast-paced brawl Hooper was controlling early rounds but the balance of the fight changed early in the fifth round with Quinlan dropping Hooper twice in the 5th round and Hooper eventually won the bout in the 9th round by TKO.

Quinlan vs. Buatsi 
In his next fight, Quinlan fought undefeated prospect Joshua Buatsi. Buatsi was ranked #9 by the WBA at light heavyweight. Buatsi won the fight convincingly with a first round TKO.

Professional record

References

External links

 
 Renold Quinlan - Profile, News Archive & Current Rankings at Box.Live

Indigenous Australian boxers
Australian people of I-Taukei Fijian descent
Sportsmen from New South Wales
Living people
Australian male boxers
1989 births
Boxers from Sydney
International Boxing Organization champions
Super-middleweight boxers